Jose Sanchez may refer to:

Sportspeople
José Alberto Sánchez (born 1986), Cuban steeplechase athlete
José Antonio Sánchez, Paralympic athlete from Spain
José Arturo Sánchez (born 1996), Dominican footballer
José Domingo Sánchez (1911–?), Colombian Olympic sprinter
José Enrique (footballer) (José Enrique Sánchez, born 1986), Spanish footballer
José Sánchez (cyclist) (born 1941), Costa Rican Olympic cyclist
José Sánchez (footballer, born 1987), Costa Rican footballer
José Manuel Sánchez (born 1994), Mexican boxer
Tente Sánchez (José Vicente Sánchez, born 1956), Spanish footballer
José Sánchez (footballer, born 2003), Peruvian footballer
Pepe Sánchez (footballer) (José Sánchez Martínez, born 2000), Spanish footballer
José Luis Sánchez (Argentine footballer) (1974–2006), Argentine football midfielder
José Luis Sánchez (sport shooter) (born 1987), Mexican sport shooter
José Luis Sánchez Paraíso (1942–2017), Spanish sprinter

Others
José Bernardo Sánchez (1778–1833), Spanish missionary
José de la Cruz Sánchez (1799–1878), the Alcalde of San Francisco, California
Jose "Fubar" Sanchez, Canadian video game journalist for Reviews on the Run and EP Daily
José Hernán Sánchez Porras (1944–2014), Venezuelan Roman Catholic bishop
José León Sánchez (born 1930), Costa Rican novelist
José Luis García Sánchez (born 1941), Spanish film director and screenwriter
Jose Tomas Sanchez (1920–2012), Cardinal Prefect Emeritus of the Philippines
José María Sánchez Martínez (born 1983), Spanish economist

See also 
Pepe Sánchez (disambiguation)